Nokaneng Airport  is an airport serving the village of Nokaneng on the western edge of the Okavango Delta in Botswana.

See also

Transport in Botswana
List of airports in Botswana

References

External links
OpenStreetMap - Nokaneng
OurAirports - Nokaneng
Fallingrain - Nokaneng Airport

Airports in Botswana
North-West District (Botswana)